The Jawaharlal Nehru Stadium is a multi-purpose stadium in Ghaziabad, Uttar Pradesh. The ground is mainly used for matches of football, cricket and other sports. The stadium hosted six first-class matches  in 1992 when Uttar Pradesh cricket team played against railways cricket team. The stadium has hosted many non-first-class matches including a match between touring Nepal cricket team and Ghaziabad District Cricket Association in 2013.

The also hosted a Youth Test match between India national under-19 cricket team and England under-19 cricket team in 1993. Association football club Ghaziabad FC sometimes use the stadium.

References

External links 
 cricketarchive
 espncricinfo
 Wikimapia

Cricket grounds in Uttar Pradesh
Sport in Ghaziabad
Buildings and structures in Ghaziabad, Uttar Pradesh
Sports venues completed in 1990
1990 establishments in Uttar Pradesh
20th-century architecture in India